The 2021 U-18 European Baseball Championship was the eighth edition of the U-18 European Baseball Championship, the biennial international men's youth football championship contested by the under-18 national teams of the member associations of WBSC Europe, since its inception in 2007 as the European Junior Baseball Championship. The tournament was hosted by the Italy from 5–11 July.

A total of nine teams played in the final tournament, with players born on or after 1 January 2003 eligible to participate.

In the final, the Netherlands defeated Italy 6–2 for their fourth title. Italy and the Netherlands qualified for the 2021 U-18 Baseball World Cup as the top two finishers in the tournament.

First round

Group A

Group B

Relegation round

Knockout stage

References

European Junior Baseball Championship
International baseball competitions hosted by Italy
U-18 European Baseball Championship
U-18 European Baseball Championship